Perjury is a 1929 German drama film directed by Georg Jacoby and starring Alice Roberts, Francis Lederer, and Miles Mander. It was shot at the Staaken Studios in Berlin. The film's sets were designed by the art director [[[André Andrejew]].

Cast
Alice Roberts as Inge Sperber
Francis Lederer as Fenn
Miles Mander as Adolf Sperber
Inge Landgut as Elschen Sperber
Paul Henckels as prosecutor
La Jana as Daisy Storm
Carl Auen as defense lawyer
Gerd Briese as police officer

References

External links

1929 drama films
Films of the Weimar Republic
German silent feature films
German drama films
Films directed by Georg Jacoby
German black-and-white films
Films produced by Seymour Nebenzal
Silent drama films
1920s German films
Films shot at Staaken Studios